John Tyler (1790–1862) was the president of the United States from 1841 to 1845.

John Tyler may also refer to:
John Tyler Sr. (1747–1813), father of President Tyler and Governor of Virginia
John Alexander Tyler (1848–1883), second son of President Tyler and his second wife, Julia Gardiner Tyler
John Tyler (bishop) (1640–1724), Bishop of Llandaff
John Poyntz Tyler (1862–1931), Episcopal bishop, nephew of President Tyler
John Tyler (doctor) (1764-1841), ophthalmologist

See also
John Tyler High School
John Tyler Community College
Johnny Tyler (1918–1961), American singer
Johnnie Tyler (1906–1972), American baseball player
Tyler Prize for Environmental Achievement, established by John and Alice Tyler in 1973